Durjaya (Hindi for "difficult to conquer") was a legendary chieftain of the Andhra kingdom. Many ruling dynasties in Andhra and Telangana, such as the Kakatiyas , Malyalas, Viryalas, the Konakandravadis, the Ivani Kandravadis, the Kondapadumatis, the Paricchedis and the Chagis, are claimed to be his descendants. In the opinion of Bhavaraju Venkata Krishna Rao, he probably flourished in the 3rd century AD.

Parichuri Kethi Nayakudu has claimed Durjaya/Kondapadamati Budhavarma lineage.

References

 Andhra Pradesh